Kinloch is a hamlet that is the main (now only) settlement of the island of Rùm, in the civil parish of the Small Isles, in the council area of Highland, Scotland. It has a primary school, village hall and shop and is the location of the ferry terminal. It is on Loch Scresort and centred round Kinloch Castle.

History 
The name "Kinloch" means "Loch head". Historically Kinloch was not the most prominent settlement on Rùm, but is now the only one still inhabited. In 1850 Port na Caranean was abandoned and people moved to Kinloch which had a population of 40.

References 

Hamlets in Scotland
Villages in the Inner Hebrides
Populated places in Lochaber
Rùm